Muhammad Ashfaq (November 11, 1946 – July 3, 2005) was a Pakistani field hockey player. He won a gold medal at the 1968 Summer Olympics in Mexico City.

Death
He died on 3 July 2005 in Rawalpindi, Pakistan, and was buried in local Alif Shah graveyard.

References

External links
 

Olympic field hockey players of Pakistan
Olympic gold medalists for Pakistan
Olympic medalists in field hockey
Medalists at the 1968 Summer Olympics
Field hockey players at the 1968 Summer Olympics
Asian Games medalists in field hockey
Field hockey players at the 1970 Asian Games
Asian Games gold medalists for Pakistan
Medalists at the 1970 Asian Games
1946 births
2005 deaths
20th-century Pakistani people